Crucispora is a genus of fungi in the family Agaricaceae. The genus, described by mycologist Egon Horak in 1971, contains two species found in New Zealand and Asia.

See also
List of Agaricales genera
List of Agaricaceae genera

References

Agaricaceae
Agaricales genera
Taxa named by Egon Horak